The 2015 Tampa Bay Buccaneers season was the franchise's 40th season in the National Football League and the second under head coach Lovie Smith. The offseason was marked by the draft selection of All-American Florida State quarterback Jameis Winston first overall in the 2015 NFL Draft. The team wore a patch to commemorate the club's 40th season.

After their Week 8 overtime win at Atlanta, the Buccaneers had already improved on their record from 2014 (2–14). Entering the month of December, Tampa Bay had just swept division rival Atlanta, avenging an ugly 56–14 defeat on TNF a year earlier. The team found themselves mathematically in the hunt for a playoff berth with a 6–6 record. Despite showing improvement, the Buccaneers lost their final four games of the season. They finished 6–10 and last in the NFC South for the fifth straight year.

Despite missing the playoffs, Doug Martin finished second in the league in rushing yards (just 82 yards shy of Adrian Peterson), and the franchise had their first ever season finishing in the top five in total offense. Winston, who started all 16 games, was voted the Pepsi NFL Rookie of the Year. On the defense side, the Buccaneers made improvements, ranking in the top ten in total yards and points allowed. 

On January 6, 2016, head coach Lovie Smith was fired after two seasons as head coach.

2015 draft class

Notes
 The Buccaneers acquired additional selections in the fourth- and sixth-rounds (Nos. 109 and 184 overall, respectively) in a trade that sent safety Mark Barron to the St. Louis Rams.
 The Buccaneers traded their original fourth- and sixth-round selections (Nos. 101 and 178 overall, respectively) and tight end Tim Wright to the New England Patriots in exchange for guard Logan Mankins and the Patriots' fifth-round selection (No. 168 overall).
 The Buccaneers acquired an additional fifth-round selection (No. 162 overall) in a trade that sent guard/center Jeremy Zuttah to the Baltimore Ravens.
 The Buccaneers traded their original fifth-round selection (No. 137 overall), along with a 2014 seventh-round selection to the Buffalo Bills in exchange for the Bills' 2014 fifth-round selection during the third day of the 2014 NFL draft.
 The Buccaneers acquired an additional seventh-round selection (No. 231 overall) and in addition with defensive end George Johnson from the Detroit Lions in exchange for the fifth-round selection (No. 168 overall) that was acquired from the Patriots.

Staff

Final roster

Schedule

Preseason

Regular season

Note: Intra-division opponents are in bold text.

Game summaries

Week 1: vs. Tennessee Titans

Opening day was a matchup between the No. 1 overall and the No. 2 overall selections in the 2015 NFL draft.
Jameis Winston started at quarterback for Tampa Bay, and Marcus Mariota started at quarterback for Tennessee. Mariota snagged the headlines for the day, passing for 209 yards and four touchdowns as the Titans routed the Buccaneers 42–14. Winston’s Buccaneer debut was mostly forgetful, as his first pass attempt in the NFL was a "pick 6" interception.

Week 2: at New Orleans Saints

Tampa Bay rebounded after their week 1 loss, and defeated the New Orleans Saints for the first time since October 2011. Jameis Winston threw a touchdown pass and ran for a touchdown, as Tampa Bay jumped out to a 23-7 lead. The Saints rallied, and had two chances for a game-tying touchdown in the final 8 seconds. Drew Brees final throw was knocked down at the endline, and the Buccaneers snapped a 7-game losing streak dating back to the 2014 season.

Week 3: at Houston Texans

Buccaneers kicker Kyle Brindza missed three field goals and missed an extra point, as Tampa Bay fell at Houston by the score of 19–9. Jameis Winston threw for 261 yards, one touchdown pass, and one interception in the loss. Brindza did make a 58-yard field goal in the second quarter, which was the second-longest field goal in franchise history. Midway through the third quarter Vincent Jackson appeared to catch a 23-yard touchdown pass from Winston, but it was overturned after review, when it was determined that he did not get both feet down.

Week 4: vs. Carolina Panthers

Cam Newton threw for 124 yards and two touchdown passes, as Carolina beat Tampa Bay by the score of 37–23. Jameis Winston threw for 287 yards and two touchdowns, but threw four interceptions (one returned for a touchdown), and lost a fumbled snap in the defeat. After his struggles the previous week, Buccaneers kicker Kyle Brindza missed two field goals and an extra point, and was cut by the club on Monday morning.

Week 5: vs. Jacksonville Jaguars

Tampa Bay snapped an 11-game home losing streak that dated back to December 2013, defeating Jacksonville by the score of 38–31. Doug Martin rushed for 123 yards, two touchdowns, and had one receiving touchdown. Connor Barth returned to the club as kicker, going 3-for-3 on field goals, and 3-for-3 on extra points.

Week 7: at Washington Redskins

Tampa Bay blew a 24–0 lead to the Redskins . Kirk Cousins threw a game-winning 6-yard touchdown pass to Jordan Reed with 24 seconds left in regulation.

Week 8: at Atlanta Falcons

Atlanta turned the ball over four times, twice inside the red zone. Tampa Bay jumped out to a 17-point lead, with 20 points scored off of turnovers. However, Matt Ryan threw a game-tying touchdown pass to Julio Jones with 17 seconds left in regulation to force overtime. The Buccaneers won the coin toss in overtime, and scored a field goal on their first possession. The Tampa Bay defense held Atlanta to a turnover on downs, securing a 23–20 victory.

Week 9: vs. New York Giants

Jameis Winston scrambled for a 10-yard touchdown run with 9:25 remaining, but the potential game-tying two point conversion attempt failed. The Giants subsequently kicked two field goals to go back up by 8 points. The Buccaneers attempted a hook and lateral play as time expired, but Trevin Wade of the Giants recovered the loose ball and ran it in for a touchdown the other way.

Week 10: vs. Dallas Cowboys

Dallas and Tampa Bay were limited to field goals for the first 59 minutes of the game. Trailing 6-3 with just over one minute left, Buccaneers quarterback Jameis Winston scrambled for a 4-yard run to the endzone, but lost the ball as he was up-ended just short of the goal line. Dallas recovered the fumble, but was penalized for defensive holding by Jeff Heath. On the next play, Winston ran a naked bootleg for a 1-yard touchdown and a 10-6 Tampa Bay lead with 59 seconds remaining in regulation. With 28 seconds left, Matt Cassel's pass intended for Dez Bryant was intercepted by Bradley McDougald in the endzone to secure the victory. Bryant lobbied for pass interference due to contact by McDougald, but it was not called. It was Tampa Bay's first victory against Dallas since 2003, and the Cowboys' 7th straight loss (all without Tony Romo).

Week 11: at Philadelphia Eagles

Doug Martin rushed for 235 yards, and Jameis Winston threw five touchdown passes (tying an NFL rookie record), as Tampa Bay routed the Eagles by a score of 45–17. The combined 283 rushing yards was a franchise record for the Buccaneers, and the 521 total offensive yards was the second-highest regular season total in team history.

Week 12: at Indianapolis Colts

Matt Hasselbeck threw for 315 yards and two touchdowns passes to T. Y. Hilton as the Colts defeated Tampa Bay 25-12.

Week 13: vs. Atlanta Falcons

Tampa Bay swept Atlanta for the first time since 2007. Jameis Winston threw for 227 yards, one touchdown pass, and one rushing touchdown. Winston connected on a 6-yard touchdown pass to Mike Evans with 1:39 remaining for the game-winning score. One play later, Lavonte David sealed the win with an interception of Matt Ryan on the first play of the Falcons' final drive.

Week 14: vs. New Orleans Saints

Drew Brees threw for 312 yards and two touchdown passes, as New Orleans defeated Tampa Bay 24-17. The Saints jumped out to a 14–0 lead in the second quarter, and led 17–10 at halftime. Tampa Bay made the score 24-17 after Jameis Winston threw a touchdown pass to Adam Humphries with just under 9 minutes left in regulation. Trailing by 7, the Buccaneers got the ball back with 5:22 to go, but went 3-and-out. The Saints were then able to run out the clock to secure the win.

Week 15: at St. Louis Rams

Case Keenum threw for 234 yards and two touchdowns for the St. Louis Rams on Thursday Night Football. The Rams jumped out to a 28–6 lead after three quarters. Jameis Winston rallied the Buccaneers with a career-high 363 yards passing, and threw two touchdown passes to trim the deficit to 31–23 with 1:34 left in regulation. An onside kick attempt failed, and the Rams ran out the clock to secure the victory. This would become the final home game for the Rams in St. Louis, as the team relocated back to Los Angeles for the 2016 season.

Week 16: vs. Chicago Bears

Jameis Winston’s hail-mary pass touchdown to Austin-Seferian Jenkins is not enough as Tampa Bay fell to Chicago 26–21 in the Buccaneers’ final home game of the season, and Lovie Smith went 0–2 against his former Bears team that fired him at the end of the 2012 season.

Week 17: at Carolina Panthers

Carolina swept the season series and finished with a record of 15–1. Tampa Bay finished the season losing their final four games and slipped to 6-10. After an incomplete pass by Jameis Winston, Mike Evans exchanged heated words with the officials resulting in Evans receiving two unsportsmanlike conduct fouls and an ejection from the game.

Standings

Division

Conference

Awards
 Week 2: Pepsi Next Rookie of the Week — Jameis Winston
 Week 3: Pepsi Next Rookie of the Week — Kwon Alexander
 Week 5: FedEx Ground Player of the Week — Doug Martin
 Week 5: Special Teams Player of the Week — Bobby Rainey
 Week 5: Pepsi Next Rookie of the Week — Jameis Winston
 Week 11: Defensive Player of the Week — Lavonte David
 Week 11: FedEx Air Player of the Week — Jameis Winston
 Week 11: Pepsi Next Rookie of the Week — Jameis Winston
 Week 11: FedEx Ground Player of the Week — Doug Martin
 November: Offensive Rookie of the Month — Jameis Winston
 Week 13: Castrol Edge Clutch Performer of the Week — Jameis Winston

References

External links
 

Tampa Bay
Tampa Bay Buccaneers seasons
Tampa Bay Buccaneers